Adrián Fernández González (born 31 January 2004) is a Spanish motorcycle racer, currently competing in the 2022 Moto3 World Championship for Red Bull KTM Tech3. His older brother, Raúl, is also a motorcycle racer for KTM Tech3 in the MotoGP class. They are not related to Moto2 rider Augusto Fernández.

Career statistics

Grand Prix motorcycle racing

By season

By class

Races by year
(key) (Races in bold indicate pole position; races in italics indicate fastest lap)

References

External links

2004 births
Living people
Spanish motorcycle racers
Moto3 World Championship riders
Sportspeople from Madrid
21st-century Spanish people